Eupithecia delozona is a moth in the family Geometridae. It is found on Borneo.

References

Moths described in 1926
delozona
Moths of Asia